Johan Östblom (born 21 April 1982) is a Swedish bandy player who plays for the AIK. He primarily plays as a midfielder but can also play as a defender. In 2014, Östblom became the third player (after Ola Johansson and Stefan Karlsson) to win three Swedish championships with three clubs.

He is the cousin of Swedish footballer Kim Källström.

Club career
Johan Östblom was a youth product of Örebro SK but moved to Västerås SK before making a first team appearance. In Sweden, he has played for Örebro SK, Västerås SK, Bollnäs GIF, Hammarby IF, Sandvikens AIK.

In 2014, Östberg joined Russian Bandy Super League team SKA-Neftyanik.

References

External links

Swedish bandy players
Expatriate bandy players in Russia
Living people
1982 births
Västerås SK Bandy players
Bollnäs GIF players
Hammarby IF Bandy players
Sandvikens AIK players
SKA-Neftyanik players
AIK Bandy players